Gursum is the name of several geographical points in Ethiopia:

 Gursum, Oromia (woreda), one of the 180 woredas in the Oromia Region of Ethiopia
 Gursum, Somali (woreda), one of the 93 woredas in the Somali Region of Ethiopia
 Fugnan Bira, a town in the Gursum woreda of Oromia also known by the name Gursum
 the Gursum meteorite of 1981, which fell in Hararghe, Ethiopia (see meteorite falls)